Taipei Municipal Jianguo High School (CKHS; formerly Chien Kuo from the Wade-Giles transliteration) is a public high school for boys located in Zhongzheng District, Taipei, Taiwan. The school was established in 1898 during the early years of Japanese rule. Originally named "No. 1 Taihoku High School", it was the first public high school in Taiwanese history. CKHS requires the highest scores on the national senior high school entrance exams. As of July 2021, CKHS's alumni include 1 Nobel Prize laureate (Physics), the only ethnic Chinese Turing Award laureate, 1 Cannes Film Festival Award winner (Best Director), 1 head of state, at least 5 members of the US National Academy of Sciences, and numerous scholars and public servants. Its female counterpart is the Taipei First Girls' High School.

History

Jianguo High School was the first public high school in Taiwan. Except for a short period following the Chinese Civil War, the school has been an all-boys high school. The red brick building was built in 1909 during Japanese rule and is considered one of Taipei's historical buildings. Originally called Taipei First Boys School, it was renamed in 1946 (along with Taipei Second Boys School) so that the two names would spell out the phrase "successfully establish a country", thus naming them Jianguo High School and Chenggong High School. During Japanese rule, because Jianguo was reserved primarily for the Japanese while Taipei Second Boys School allowed entry for the Taiwanese. The two schools developed a competitive nature that persists to this day.

Overview

Students attending the school are widely recognized for their distinctive khaki uniforms and green bookbags. Only the top scorers on the Comprehensive Assessment Program receive admission. The school has graduated over 100,000 students in its history. For many international science and math competitions (e.g. the International Science Olympiad), students from Jianguo are chosen to represent Taiwan.  As of 2007, students from Jianguo High School have won 46 gold, 63 silver and 21 bronze medals in International Mathematical Olympiad, International Physics Olympiad, International Chemistry Olympiad, International Olympiad in Informatics, and International Biology Olympiad. Since 2000, students from Jianguo have received 11 medals in the IMO/IPhO/IChO/IBO/IOI/IESO per year on average.

Notable alumni 
 Alec Su: singer (Xiao Hu Dui, Solo), actor
 Andrew Yao: computer scientist, Turing Award laureate (2000), Academician of Academia Sinica
 Benjamin Hsiao(): Distinguished Professor, Department of Chemistry, Stony Brook University; Fellow of the American Physical Society and American Chemical Society
 Calvin Chen: singer
 Chen Shih-chung(): dentist, Minister of Ministry of Health and Welfare of Republic of China (Taiwan)
 Chang-Lin Tien: chemical engineer, former chancellor of the University of California, Berkeley, Academician of Academia Sinica, member of the US National Academy of Engineering and American Academy of Arts and Sciences
 Chang San-cheng(): engineer, former Premier of the Republic of China, former Director of National Center for High-Performance Computing
 Chen Chien-jen(): epidemiologist, Academician of Academia Sinica, member of the US National Academy of Sciences, former Vice President of the Republic of China (Taiwan)
 Chiang Peng-chien: democracy activist, the first chairperson of the Democratic Progressive Party 
 Cyrus Chu(): economist, Academician of Academia Sinica, member of the US National Academy of Sciences, former public servant and diplomat
 Ding-Shinn Chen(): hepatologist, Academician of Academia Sinica, member of the US National Academy of Sciences
 Edward Yang(): film director, Cannes Festival Best Director Award winner (2000) 
 Eric Chu: politician, former President of Executive Yuan, former Associate Professor of Accounting at National Taiwan University
 Fredrick Chien: diplomat, former President of Control Yuan, former minister of Ministry of Foreign Affairs (Taiwan)
 Fu Kun-cheng: professor of law, former lawmaker
 James C. Liao(): President of Academia Sinica; Parsons Foundation Professor, Department of Chemical and Biomolecular Engineering, UCLA
 Jeffrey Koo Sr.: former chairperson of Chinatrust Commercial Bank
 Kuan Chung-ming: economist, Academician of Academia Sinica, President of National Taiwan University
 Kwang-chih Chang: anthropologist, Academician of Academia Sinica, member of US National Academy of Sciences, former Vice President of Academia Sinica
 Lai Ching-te(): politician, medical doctor, Vice President of the Republic of China (Taiwan)
 Lu Hsiu-yi: democracy activist, former legislator
 Lü Shao-chia: world-renowned opera and orchestra conductor
 Lu Yen-hsun: professional tennis player (formerly #1 in Asia)
 Ma Ying-jeou: former President of Republic of China (Taiwan), professor of law
 Pai Hsien-yung: novelist, Professor Emeritus of East Asian Languages and Cultural Studies at the University of California, Santa Barbara
 Samuel C. C. Ting: physicist, Nobel Prize in Physics laureate (1976), Academician of Academia Sinica
 Stan Lai(): playwright, theatre director
 Su Beng: independence activist and author of Modern History of Taiwanese in 400 Years
 Wang Kuan-hung: professional swimmer 
 Wei min Hao: atmospheric chemist, climatologist, contributor to the Intergovernmental Panel on Climate Change which won Nobel Peace Prize (2007)

References

External links 

 

1898 establishments in Taiwan
Boys' schools in Taiwan
Educational institutions established in 1898
High schools in Taiwan
Schools in Taipei